is a Japanese football player.

Club statistics
Updated to 23 February 2016.

References

External links

 Profile at Kataller Toyama

1986 births
Living people
University of Tsukuba alumni
Association football people from Saitama Prefecture
Japanese footballers
J2 League players
J3 League players
FC Gifu players
Kataller Toyama players
Tochigi SC players
Association football forwards